Emilie Valenciano Rojas (born 15 February 1997) is a Costa Rican footballer who plays as a defender for Asheville City SC. She is a member of the Costa Rica women's national football team. She was part of the team at the 2015 FIFA Women's World Cup.

References

External links
 

1997 births
Living people
Costa Rican women's footballers
Costa Rica women's international footballers
Place of birth missing (living people)
2015 FIFA Women's World Cup players
Women's association football defenders